The Graduate School of Political Management (GSPM) at the George Washington University is a school of political management and applied politics, strategic communications and civic engagement. Its graduates hold a variety of professional titles including campaign managers, pollsters, speechwriters, communications professionals, legislative aides and directors, candidates, lobbyists, and new media experts.

It is the only school of applied politics in Washington, D.C. The faculty trains students of all political persuasions in how to win campaigns, advance legislative goals  and impact public opinion ethically.

History
GSPM was founded in 1987 as an independent graduate school chartered by the New York State Board of Regents, with the understanding that proper politics requires training.

The school's first class convened on the Manhattan campus of Baruch College. In 1991, the school opened a degree program on the urban campus of the George Washington University, in the Foggy Bottom neighborhood, just a few blocks from the White House, Capitol Hill, both major political parties and many of the top consulting, lobbying and public relations firms in the country.

The  university's Columbian College of Arts and Sciences formally acquired GSPM in 1995, and in 2006, the school moved into the College of Professional Studies (CPS), where it is currently located. Designed for working professionals, classes meet in the evenings.

Campus and facilities 
GSPM's programs are mainly located in three different areas of Washington, D.C.

 The Political Management courses take place at the George Washington University's Foggy Bottom campus, located in the centre of  the city, close to the White House.
 Legislative Affairs programs are located in the Hall of the States building, across from the United States Capitol Complex.
 The Strategic Public Relations master's program   is located at George Washington University's's Graduate Education Center

Organization and administration 
GSPM is led by Lara Brown, a political scientist, author, and presidential appointee serving under President Bill Clinton in the Department of Education.  The school is also supported and directed by a Board of Advisors, which is composed of officials and experts from varying backgrounds, including politics, media, communications and others.

Academics
GSPM offers 4  master's programs (one in Spanish) and 6 graduate certificates (two in Spanish). The current master's programs are Political Management, Legislative Affairs, Strategic Public Relations and Comunicación Política y Gobernanza. The Political Management and Strategic Public Relations master's degrees are availably as fully online programs.

Admission criteria and tuition at GSPM vary and depend on the selected degree and courses. The school offers a range of options for financial assistance, including different scholarships.

For bachelor students in Political Science, Political Communication or Journalism and Mass Communication at the George Washington University, the master's programs at GSPM can be combined and studied as a dual degree.

Students at GSPM have a variety of worldwide short-time study abroad options, including residency courses available on five continents.  GSPM offers additional courses and training from a pool of school fellows, which are experts in their field and come to serve at GSPM for 18 month terms. The school also offers professional seminars to externals.

Research centers 
The Global Center for Political Management is the school's research department. It focuses on public opinion survey data through the Society of Presidential Pollsters, as well as the George Washington University Battleground Poll.

The school researches the use of social media through its Public Echoes Of Rhetoric In America (PEORIA) Project, which uses data from Twitter to explore how campaign messages are developed and spread through social media.

GSPM is also home to the Battleground Poll, a project of national surveys conducted by pollsters Ed Goeas and Celinda Lake and the big data computational and analytic Shenkman Initiative. The school also runs the Society of Presidential Pollsters, a project which research focuses on the relationship between U.S. presidents and their pollsters. The society was founded by Mark J. Penn, a political consultant and former pollster to Bill Clinton.

Since 2013, GSPM hosts the Reimagining Disruption conference, an initiative bringing together officials to discuss the future of political communication in an era of increasing communicational conflict.

Rankings 
GSPM's master's degree program in Strategic Public Relations was named PRWeek's PR Education Program of the Year in 2015.

Notable people

Alumni
GSPM has more than 4,000 alumni all around the world, representing more than 40 nations and working in government, politics, public relations and public affairs. Each year GSPM awards the Alumni Achievement Award to a number of alumni demonstrating the schools values in their careers and communities.

Notable alumni of GSPM include:
Juan Guaidó ('09) - Interim President of Venezuela
Karen Makishima ('01) -  Representative of the Kanagawa 17th District, House of Representatives, National Diet of Japan
Matt Rhoades ('99) - Founder and CEO of America Rising
 Stephanie Schriock ('97) - President of EMILY's List, Campaign Manager Al Franken for Senate, Campaign Manager Jon Tester for Senate
 Jaqueline Melgar - Funcionaria diplomática de Guatemala

Faculty 

 Christopher Arterton - Former GSPM dean
Mary Landrieu - Three-term United States Senator and current Senior Policy Advisor at Van Ness Feldman

References

External links 

 Official website

 
Colleges and Schools of The George Washington University
1987 establishments in Washington, D.C.